Saint-Front-sur-Lémance (Languedocien: Sent Front de Lemança) is a commune in the Lot-et-Garonne department in south-western France.

See also
Communes of the Lot-et-Garonne department

References

Saintfrontsurlemance